Elections to Kirklees Metropolitan Borough Council were held on 4 May 2006. One third of the council was up for election and the council stayed under no overall control.

Council results

Council Composition
Prior to the election the composition of the council was:

After the election the composition of the council was:

Ward results

Almondbury ward

The incumbent was Linda Wilkinson.

Ashbrow ward

The incumbent was Jean Calvert.

Batley East ward

The incumbent was Mahmood Akhtar.

Batley West ward

The incumbent was Geoffrey Alvy who stood down at this election.

Birstall and Birkenshaw ward

The incumbent was Liz Smaje.

Cleckheaton ward

The incumbent was Ann Raistrick.

Colne Valley ward

The incumbent was Dorothy Lindley.

Crosland Moor and Netherton ward

The incumbent was Shahida Awan

Dalton ward

The incumbent was Angela Ellam.

Denby Dale ward

The incumbent was Jim Dodds.

Dewsbury East ward

The incumbent was Eric Firth.

Dewsbury South ward

The incumbent was Jonathan Scott.

Dewsbury West ward

The incumbent was Keith Oldroyd.

Golcar ward

The incumbent was Andrew Marchington.

Greenhead ward

The incumbent was Mohan Sokhal.

Heckmondwike ward

The incumbent was Tabasum Aslam who stood down at this election.

Holme Valley North ward

The incumbent was Mike Bower who stood down at this election.

Holme Valley South ward

The incumbent was Nigel Patrick.

Kirkburton ward

The incumbent was Christine Smith.

Lindley ward

The incumbent was Tony Brice.

Liversedge and Gomersal ward

The incumbent was David Hall.

Mirfield ward

The incumbent was Beverley Warby who stood down at this election.

Newsome ward

The incumbent was Sharon Fallows who stood down at this election.

References

2006 English local elections
2006
2000s in West Yorkshire